The 1920 North Carolina State Aggies football team was an American football team represented North Carolina State University in the South Atlantic Intercollegiate Athletic Association (SAIAA) during the 1920 college football season. In its second season under head coach Bill Fetzer, the team compiled a 7–3 record.

Schedule

References

NC State
NC State Wolfpack football seasons
NC State Aggies football